CJRI-FM is a Canadian radio station in Fredericton, New Brunswick, broadcasting on 104.5 MHz. The station broadcasts a Christian format and is owned by long-time local broadcaster Ross Ingram, who also hosts the morning show. The station airs a mix of music, including Southern Gospel and Praise music, as well as talk and teaching programs from religious leaders such as David Jeremiah and Dr. Charles Stanley. CJRI-FM is also heard on several rebroadcasters around New Brunswick.

History
The station has been on the air since May 18, 2005, originally on 94.7 FM.

Due to interference from WBCQ-FM, a radio station which launched in Monticello, Maine, in September 2008, CJRI-FM applied to the Canadian Radio-Television and Telecommunications Commission for a frequency change to 104.5. This application was approved on November 27, 2008.

Rebroadcasters

References

External links
CJRI Radio
 

Jri
Jri
Radio stations established in 2005
2005 establishments in New Brunswick